Xerospiraea is a genus of flowering plants belonging to the family Rosaceae.

Its native range is Mexico.

Species:
 Xerospiraea hartwegiana (Rydb.) Henrard

References

Amygdaloideae
Rosaceae genera